USLP may refer to:
 U.S. Labor Party (founded 1972)
 Labor Party (United States, 1996) (founded 1996) 
 United States Libertarian Party
 Liberty Party (1840s)
 Liberty Party (1930s)